Bodric Dimitri Tagne Fogueing, also known as Dimitri Tagne, is a Cameroonian professional footballer born in Cameroon and spent his younger days in Malaysia before he embarked on a journeyman career for professional football.

Early years

The Cameroon striker used to terrorise opponents in youth tournaments in Malaysia. Dimitri was in Malaysia when he was 13 years old and played for a youth team in Mount Kiara before returning home after three years.

The 19-year-old is now making a huge impact in only his second professional season. Last year, he scored 18 goals for Colombo in the Sri Lankan League.

Dimitri has netted nine times for MISC-MIFA, which is a respectable tally considering that his club have limitations in every department due to budget constraints.

Sources
http://www.colombofc.com/player/bodric-jimmy/

1997 births
Living people
Association football forwards
Cameroonian footballers
Colombo FC players